The Maryland Attorney General election of 2018 was held on November 6, 2018, to elect the Attorney General of Maryland. Incumbent Democratic Attorney General Brian Frosh was eligible to seek a second term in office, filed for re-election on February 15, 2018, and was unopposed for the Democratic nomination. Republican former prosecutor and trade group CEO Craig Wolf was unopposed for the Republican nomination. Brian Frosh won with 64.8% of the vote.

Democratic primary

Candidates

Declared
 Brian Frosh, incumbent attorney general

Results

Republican primary

Candidates

Declared
 Craig Wolf, former prosecutor and trade group CEO

Endorsements

Results

General election

Candidates
 Brian Frosh (Democratic), incumbent Maryland Attorney General
 Craig Wolf (Republican), former prosecutor and trade group CEO

Polling

Results

See also
 2018 United States elections
 2018 Maryland gubernatorial election
 2018 Maryland Comptroller election

References

Attorney General
Maryland
Maryland Attorney General elections